The Taiwan broad-muzzled bat or Taiwan broad-muzzled myotis (Submyotodon latirostris) is a species of vesper bat found in Taiwan.

Taxonomy
It was described as a new species in 1932 by Japanese arachnologist Kyukichi Kishida.
The holotype had been collected in Taiwan.
Kishida placed it in the genus Myotis with a binomial of M. latirostris.
In subsequent publications, it was considered by various authors to be a subspecies of the whiskered bat (M. mystacinus) or the wall-roosting mouse-eared bat (M. muricola).
However, its lineage is basal to all other Myotis species.
It is still within the Myotinae subfamily, though its morphological and genetic differences justified placing it in a separate genus.

Description
Its skull is overall smooth and lacking crests, and the occipital bone of the braincase is distinctly raised, which is one if its identifying features.
The fur of its back is long and shaggy, described as a "dark slaty brown."
The tips of individual hairs are lighter brown.
The fur of its belly is also dark brown, though the tips of the hairs are a more golden color.

Range and habitat
It is found in Taiwan, where it is considered relatively common.

References

Submyotodon
Mammals described in 1932
Mammals of Taiwan
Bats of Asia
Taxa named by Kyukichi Kishida